Vasile Dorel Năstase (born 1 January 1962) is a retired Romanian rower. Competing in eights he won silver medals at the 1992 Olympics and 1993 World Championships. He also won the world title in coxed fours in 1989.

References

External links
 

1962 births
Living people
Romanian male rowers
Rowers at the 1992 Summer Olympics
Olympic silver medalists for Romania
Olympic rowers of Romania
Olympic medalists in rowing
World Rowing Championships medalists for Romania
Medalists at the 1992 Summer Olympics